Lorenzo da Viterbo was, together with Antoniazzo Romano, the greatest native painter of the early Renaissance (second half of the fifteenth century) in the region of Rome.

He was probably educated in Rome under Piero della Francesca (frescoes in the d'Estouteville chapel in S.Maria Maggiore, 1459).

In 1464-66 ca. he frescoed the chapel (Stories of Christ) and loggia (Illustrious Men) in the Orsini Palace at Tagliacozzo, at the service of the brother dukes Napoleone and Roberto Orsini.

In 1468-69 he frescoed with Stories of the Virgin the Mazzatosta Chapel in the Servite Church of Santa Maria della Verità in Viterbo: the Marriage of the Virgin is an extraordinary, animated portrait of notable contemporary citizens of Viterbo. The frescoes were nearly destroyed during World War II, and have been painstakingly restored.

Lorenzo was in Florence in 1473: his protector, the Sienese Cardinal Jacopo Ammannati Piccolomini, recommended the artist to Lorenzo il Magnifico in a letter written from his villa in Monsindoli in the vicinity of Siena.

The Academy of Fine Arts of Viterbo is named after the painter.

References
 Roberto Longhi, Primizie di Lorenzo da Viterbo, in "Vita Artistica", 1926, pp. 109–114 (con lo pseudonimo di A. Ronchi), ripubblicato in Edizione delle opere complete di Roberto Longhi, vol. II. Saggi e ricerche 1925-28, Firenze 1967, tomo I, pp. 53–62
 Mostra dei frammenti ricostituiti di Lorenzo da Viterbo, catalogo a cura di C. Brandi, Roma 1946.
 Federico Zeri. Una pala d'altare di Lorenzo da Viterbo, in "Bollettino d'arte", 1953, pp. 38–44, ripubblicato in F. Zeri, Giorno per giorno nella pittura, vol. 5. Scritti sull'arte italiana del Sei e Settecento. Recensioni e altri saggi. Aggiunte, Torino 1998, pp. 265–268.
 Ignazio Faldi, Pittori viterbesi di cinque secoli, Roma 1970, pp. 31 e sgg.
 Su Lorenzo da Viterbo e Piermatteo d'Amelia. Ricerche in Abruzzo, Lazio, Marche, Umbria, a cura di Gerardo de Simone e Fabio Marcelli, numero monografico di "Predella", online (n. 30, 2011, http://www.predella.it/archivio/index91f7.html?option=com_content&view=section&id=13&Itemid=101) e a stampa (Predella Monografie n. 4, Felici Editore, Pisa 2012)
 Gerardo de Simone, Per Lorenzo da Viterbo, dal Palazzo Orsini di Tagliacozzo alla Cappella Mazzatosta, ivi, pp. 29–79 e tavv. V-XXXVI (http://www.predella.it/archivio/index2281.html?option=com_content&view=article&id=211:per-lorenzo-da-viterbo-dal-palazzo-orsini-di-tagliacozzo-alla-cappella-mazzatosta&catid=75:su-lorenzo-da-viterbo-e-piermatteo-damelia&Itemid=102#_ftnref)
Gerardo de Simone, Ercole e i leoni. Marginalia iconografici nella cappella Mazzatosta di Lorenzo da Viterbo, in Arte e politica. Studi per Antonio Pinelli, Firenze, Mandragora, 2013, pp. 26–32
 Gerardo de Simone, Art, Civic Ideology and Religion in Fifteenth-Century Viterbo, in "Anais do II Colóquio de História da Arte e da Cultura", n. 1, 2012 [2013], ISSN 2316-5677, pp. 81–91
 Gerardo de Simone, The Use of Trecento Sources in Antoniazzo Romano and Lorenzo da Viterbo, in "Predella", 35, 2014 [2015], ed. by Louise Bourdua, on line (http://www.predella.it/index.php/cerca/2014-05-20-06-07-38/51-issue-35/283-index-35.html) e a stampa (Predella Monografie, n. 9, 2014, ETS Edizioni, Pisa)
 Gerardo de Simone, L'artista come genius loci. L'esempio di Lorenzo da Viterbo, in SENSIBILIA 9, a cura di Silvia Pedone e Marco Tedeschini, Ed. Mimesis, 2017, pp. 51–74
 Lorenzo da Viterbo. Magister Pictor del Rinascimento italiano 1469-2019, a cura di B. Aniello, E. Gnignera, Gregorian & Biblical Press 2019
 http://www.viterboinrete.it/joomla/it/monumenti/chiese/35-chiesa-e-convento-di-santa-maria-della-verita

Year of birth unknown
Year of death unknown
People from Lazio
15th-century Italian painters
Quattrocento painters
Italian male painters